(The 8th Sin) is a German pornographic film, and the winner of the Venus Award for Best Film 2003.

Plot summary
The film follows the protagonist, an angel in heaven (played by Horst Baron and his female entourage, Tiffany Hopkins and Susi Webstar). They are inspired by a secret book about the seven deadly sins. The individual scenes are each based on a mortal sin.

Scene breakdown 
The first scene depicts the sin of gluttony. A married couple, played by Philippe Soine and Marlene Cartier, is brought together again after years of abstinence due to a snack attack. The second scene is dedicated to the sin of pride, in which a neglected wife (played by Nicole K.) finds the sexual attention she craves in a meeting with another man. In the following scene, Conny Dachs and Fanny Steel depict the sin of greed. The fourth scene is dominated by Janet Taylor dreaming about her perfect man to resemble the sin of sloth. The fifth sin, wrath, is depicted in a scene featuring Tyra Misoux. The following scene is dedicated to the sin of envy, starring Anja Juliette and Pierre Laval. In the seventh and last scene, the two female angels mentioned above animate several stone statues in a depiction of the final sin, lust.

Awards and honors
2003: Venus Award for "Best Film - Germany"

External links
 

2000s German-language films
2002 films
German pornographic films
2000s pornographic films
Seven deadly sins in popular culture
2000s German films